John Farrow (born 18 February 1982) is an Australian skeleton racer who has competed since 2008. His best career finish was third in lesser events at Park City, Utah in December 2009.

Farrow qualified for the 2010 Winter Olympics, but did not compete.

References

External links
 
 
 
 

1982 births
Australian male skeleton racers
Living people
Skeleton racers at the 2014 Winter Olympics
Skeleton racers at the 2018 Winter Olympics
Olympic skeleton racers of Australia
20th-century Australian people
21st-century Australian people